XHXXX-FM is a radio station on 97.5 FM in Tamazula de Gordiano, Jalisco, serving Ciudad Guzmán. It is known as Fiesta Mexicana and carries a grupera format.

History
XEQJ-AM 1550 received its concession on February 13, 1967. Owned by María del Carmen Pelayo de Pérez, it was a 500-watt daytimer. The current concessionaire took control in 1972. It soon moved to 1560 kHz in order to increase power to 5 kW, and it moved again, to 840 kHz, in the 1990s.

It was bought by Promomedios Jalisco in 1985 and approved to migrate to FM in 2011.

External links
Fiesta Mexicana Facebook

References

Radio stations in Jalisco
Radio stations in Mexico with continuity obligations